Slovenian Olympic Committee (OKS) ensures the participation of Slovenian athletes at the Olympic Games, the Mediterranean Games, and the European Youth Olympic Festival. Members of the Committee are 39 Sports Federations, which elect the Executive Council composed of the president and 21 members.

History

The Slovenian Olympic Committee was founded on 15 October 1991 and official admitted as a member of the International Olympic Committee on 17 January 1992, which enabled Slovenian athletes performance at the Winter Olympics in Albertville, France.

Presidents

Executive committee
The committee of the NOC SLO is represented by:
 President: Bogdan Gabrovec
 Honorary President: Janez Kocijančič
 Vice Presidents: Janez Sodržnik, Iztok Čop, Tomaž Barada
 Members: Gregor Benčina, Ivan Levak, Tjaša Andree Prosenc, Metod Ropret, Matej Erjavec, Stanko Glažar, Rok Vehovec, Bojan Rotovnik, Milan Žvan, Tomo Tiringer, Branko Žnidarič, Miran Kos, Dejan Crnek, Martina Ratej, Miroslav Cerar, Damjan Lazar, Vojka Ravbar

Member federations
The Slovenian National Federations are the organizations that coordinate all aspects of their individual sports. They are responsible for training, competition and development of their sports. There are currently 32 Olympic Summer and 7 Winter Sport Federations in Slovenia.

See also
Slovenia at the Olympics

External links
Official website

National Olympic Committees
Olympics
Olympic Committee

Sports organizations established in 1991